"Lei verrà" is an Italian song composed by Mango and Alberto Salerno and performed by Mango. It is included in the 1986 album Odissea.

Background
The song was entered into the main competition at the 36th edition of the Sanremo Music Festival, ranking only 14th. The single eventually was a commercial success, being awarded gold disc for having sold over 150,000 copies. The same year a duet version of the song performed by Mango and Loretta Goggi was included in the Goggi's album C'è poesia.

In 2019 Giorgia recorded a cover version of the song, released as third single from her album Pop Heart.

Track listing
7" single –  Fonit Cetra SP 1837   
 "Lei verrà" (Mango - Alberto Salerno) -  		4:00
 "Stella del nord" (Mango - Alberto Salerno) -   4:00

Charts

References

External links 

1986 singles
Italian songs
1986 songs
Sanremo Music Festival songs